Ričardas Berankis was the defending champion but chose not to defend his title.

Kamil Majchrzak won the title after defeating Radu Albot 6–4, 3–6, 6–2 in the final.

Seeds

Draw

Finals

Top half

Bottom half

References

External links
Main draw
Qualifying draw

Busan Open - 1
2022 Singles